Roger Gresham Cooke (26 January 1907 – 22 February 1970), usually known as Gresham Cooke, was a British Conservative Party (UK) politician. He was the son of Dr Arthur Cooke, F.R.C.S., senior surgeon to Addenbrooke's Hospital. A brother was Nicholas Gresham Cooke, DFC.

Early life
Cooke joined the British Road Federation as secretary in 1935, later becoming Chairman of its Highways Committee. After the war, in 1946, he was appointed director of the Society of Motor Manufacturers and Traders, a representational role which he held during a difficult period for the UK's economy and motor industry until 1955.

Political career
Cooke was Member of Parliament for Twickenham from 1955 until his death aged 63 in 1970.  No by-election was held after his death, as the 1970 general election followed only four months later, in which Toby Jessel was elected as Cooke's successor.

Personal life
Cooke married Rosalie Anne, daughter of J.R.H. Pinckney in 1934. The couple had four children, Rosalie, Vivien, Hereward and Gerald.
Rosalie and Hereward both followed their father's interest in politics. Rosalie was a Conservative councillor who led South Oxford district council for a decade, and Canon Hereward was the Liberal Democrat deputy leader of Norwich City Council between 2002 and 2006. Rosalie's son is the journalist and environmental activist George Monbiot.

Other activities
A few days before he died Cooke was lobbying for Britain's motor racing achievements to be commemorated through a special issue of postage stamps.

References

External links 
 

1907 births
1970 deaths
Conservative Party (UK) MPs for English constituencies
UK MPs 1955–1959
UK MPs 1959–1964
UK MPs 1964–1966
UK MPs 1966–1970